Janne Kolehmainen (born March 22, 1986) is a Finnish professional ice hockey forward. He most recently played with the Sheffield Steelers in the UK EIHL. He previously iced with Jyp in the Finnish Liiga. Kolehmainen was originally drafted by the Ottawa Senators 115th overall in the 2005 NHL Draft but did not sign.

He previously played for SaiPa and HPK of the SM-liiga.

Career statistics

Regular season and playoffs

International

References

External links

1986 births
Living people
Finnish ice hockey forwards
HPK players
KalPa players
Ottawa Senators draft picks
SaiPa players
Sheffield Steelers players
JYP Jyväskylä players
People from Lappeenranta
Sportspeople from South Karelia